Padma  is a village in the Padma CD block in the Barhi subdivision of the Hazaribagh district in the Indian state of Jharkhand.

History
The Padma Palace (also referred to as Padma Fort) of Ramgarh Raj is located at Padma. The Shivgarh gate is one of its main attractions. There is a photo gallery displaying the history of Ramgarh Raj. The erstwhile estate now houses a police academy. The boundary wall and the main gate are on the Patna-Ranchi highway. This is the reaction of a boy, travelling in a bus, looking at the compound wall:"This wall is not like those that people in the town surround their homes with: it’s sculpted, carved and carries little domes on its pillars. In all fairness, it looks heartbreakingly ancient, and the boy wonders if respectable grandeur is always a property of the past."

Geography

Location

Area overview
Hazaribagh district is a plateau area and forests occupy around about 45% of the total area. It is a predominantly rural area with 92.34% of the population living in rural areas against 7.66% in the urban areas. There are many census towns in the district, as can be seen in the map alongside. Agriculture is the main occupation of the people but with the extension of coal mines, particularly in the southern part of the district, employment in coal mines is increasing. However, it has to be borne in mind that modern mining operations are highly mechanised. Four operational areas of Central Coalfields are marked on the map. All these areas are spread across partly this district and partly the neighbouring districts.

Note: The map alongside presents some of the notable locations in the district. All places marked in the map are linked in the larger full screen map. Urbanisation data calculated on the basis of census data for CD blocks and may vary a little against unpublished official data.

Civic administration

Police out-post
Padma police out-post serves the Padma CD block.

CD block HQ
The headquarters of Padma CD block are located at Padma.

Demographics
According to the 2011 Census of India, Padma had a total population of 7,896, of which 4,326 (55%) were males and 3,570 (45%) were females. Population in the age range 0-6 years was 1,113. The total number of literate persons in Padma was 5,340 (78.73% of the population over 6 years).

Transport

There is a railway station at Padma on the Koderma-Hazaribagh-Barkakana-Ranchi line.

Padma is on the National Highway 20. The Padma-Itkhori Road links Padma to Itkhori.

References

Villages in Hazaribagh district